Thomas Ara Spence (February 20, 1810 – November 10, 1877) was an American politician.

Born near the Accomack Court House in Accomack County, Virginia, Spence pursued academic studies and attended a local academy.  He graduated from Yale College in 1829, studied law, and was admitted to the bar, commencing practice at Snow Hill, Maryland.  He was elected as a Whig to the Twenty-eighth Congress, serving from March 4, 1843, to March 3, 1845.  He was not a candidate for renomination, and was later affiliated with the Republican Party.

Spence owned large iron-ore properties in Worcester County, Maryland, and served as a judge for Worcester County and the twelfth judicial circuit from 1857 to 1867.  He practiced law in Salisbury, Maryland, and served as assistant attorney general for the Post Office Department from 1872 until his death in Washington, D.C..  He is interred in Makamie Memorial Church Cemetery in Snow Hill.

Thomas Spence was nephew to John Selby Spence, another Maryland Congressman.

References

External links

1810 births
1877 deaths
Yale College alumni
Maryland state court judges
People from Accomack County, Virginia
Whig Party members of the United States House of Representatives from Maryland
People from Snow Hill, Maryland
People from Salisbury, Maryland
19th-century American politicians
People from Worcester County, Maryland
19th-century American judges